Every Cloud is the upcoming second studio album by British producer and DJ Sigala. It will be released on 1 September 2023 through Ministry of Sound. The album features guest appearances from Talia Mar, David Guetta, Sam Ryder, Becky Hill, Gabry Ponte, Alex Gaudino, James Arthur, Rita Ora, Alok, Ellie Goulding, MNEK, Mae Muller, Caity Baser and Stefflon Don.

In place of the original release date, the first part, titled Every Cloud – Silver Linings and consisting of the 11 released singles, was released on 3 March 2023 along with the 11th single, "Feels This Good".

Background and composition
After the success of his debut album Brighter Days in 2018, Sigala expressed an interest in working with Becky Hill after having a few ideas for new song that he felt suited her best. In an interview with The Nocturnal Times, he said, "Growing up I was massively into trance, from the likes of Tiesto and Armin van Buuren..." which in turn served as a huge inspiration for the track.

Three years prior to working with Becky, whilst writing songs for his debut album, Sigala revealed that he took people away with him to a songwriting camp out in Thailand, which included his production partner Jarly, The Invisible Men and Ida Martinsen Botten. Some songs written with The Invisible Men made the album, including "Just Got Paid" and "What You Waiting For", whilst the rest of the material was largely forgotten about. However, some of those were uprooted for his second album, which were "Heaven on My Mind", "Melody" and "Stay the Night".

In some cases, songs were also given to Sigala by other artists to work on, which was the case for "Lasting Lover". Sigala said that the song was originally presented to him as a stripped-back acoustic song, written by Scottish singer-songwriter Lewis Capaldi, before he made it into the song it is. "It was amazing.", Sigala elaborated, "It came to me as a ballad, just like an acoustic song with just guitar and his voice on it. I worked on it a bit and I got in touch with James from there just to see if he wanted to sing it. It's really cool to have him involved." Another song that was given to him was the album's succeeding single "You for Me", which started to contribute more solid tropical house vibes. The song, originally sung and written by Charli XCX,

Sigala worked with David Guetta and 2022 Eurovision runner-up Sam Ryder on the song "Living Without You" which was sonically reminiscent to his early hit singles. He opened up about how he managed to work with Sam almost before the events of Eurovision. He elaborated, "I was so lucky to work with Sam just before Eurovision sent him stratospheric and I’ve wanted to work with David Guetta for years, he's an absolute legend". The song was worked on by Sigala and Guetta and also given to the artists by Tom Grennan, who was the song's co-writer and was also writing for other artists like Westlife and Clean Bandit.

Promotion and release
The album was announced for pre-order on 21 October 2022 and was made available for CD, vinyl and cassette formats. The track list also revealed that Sigala's previously released single "We Got Love", featuring Ella Henderson, did not make the final cut of the album. Sigala said on his social media, "I've worked so hard on this album and can't wait for it to be out." He also announced he will embark on a UK tour to promote the album in March 2023.

Track listing

Every Cloud

Every Cloud – Silver Linings

Notes
  signifies a co-producer.
 "Melody" features uncredited vocals from Ida Martinsen Botten.
 "Rely on Me" features uncredited vocals from Elvira Citro.
 "Rely on Me" samples the song "2 Times", as performed by Ann Lee and written by Annerley Gordon, Daniela Galli, Paul Sears, Marco Sorcini and Alfredo Pignagnoli.
 "Lasting Lover" samples the song "Time to Pretend", as performed by MGMT and written by Andrew VanWyngarden and Ben Goldwasser.

Charts

References

2023 albums
Ministry of Sound albums
Sigala albums